Frederick Winters (7 January 1873 – 26 April 1915) was an American weightlifter and Olympic medalist. He won a silver medal at the 1904 Summer Olympics in St. Louis.

References

External links

1873 births
1915 deaths
American male weightlifters
Weightlifters at the 1904 Summer Olympics
Olympic silver medalists for the United States in weightlifting
Medalists at the 1904 Summer Olympics
People associated with physical culture
20th-century American people